(c.1264–1343 AD) was a Japanese swordsmith.

Masamune may also refer to:

People
, a Japanese masked professional wrestler

Given name
, a Japanese samurai
, Japanese manga artist

Surname
, a Japanese critic, novelist, and dramatist
, a Japanese literature researcher and poet
, a Japanese botanist

Characters
, a character from the manga and anime Beyblade: Metal Masters
, a character from the manga and anime Soul Eater
, the title character from the manga and anime Masamune-kun's Revenge
, a character from the manga and anime Eromanga Sensei

Other
Masamune, a powerful sword in the Chrono video games
Masamune, a recurring weapon in the Final Fantasy series
 Comic Blade Masamune (2002–2007), a bi-monthly Japanese shōnen manga magazine

See also
 Muramasa
 Muramasa (disambiguation)

Japanese-language surnames
Japanese masculine given names